MacArthur Boulevard may refer to:
MacArthur Boulevard (Washington, D.C.), a road that parallels the C&O Canal in Washington, D.C. and Montgomery County, Maryland
MacArthur Boulevard in Oakland, California, a major boulevard in Oakland and a historical portion of U.S. Route 50 in California
Interstate 580 (California) in Oakland, California, known as the MacArthur Freeway as it parallels the original U.S. Route 50
MacArthur Boulevard in Orange County, California, a major boulevard running which was formerly California State Route 73